Revan is a fictional Star Wars character created for Star Wars: Knights of the Old Republic.

Revan may also refer to:

People
 Clan Revan, a Highland Scottish clan

Given name
 Revan Kelly (born 1999), Sri Lankan cricketer
 Revan Nath, the 7th or 8th Navnath
 Revan Nurianto (born 2002),  Indonesian football winger

Surname
 Dominic Revan (born 2000), English football defender

Other uses
Star Wars: The Old Republic: Revan, 2011 novel part of the Star Wars expanded universe

See also
 Revans (disambiguation)